Life on Mars is a British television series broadcast on BBC One between 9 January 2006 and 10 April 2007. It tells the story of a Manchester police officer from 2006 (played by John Simm) who mysteriously finds himself working as a police officer in 1970s Manchester. Life on Mars, and its sequel, Ashes to Ashes, are notable for combining the mystery, supernatural, science fiction, time travel, period, and police procedural drama genres. It twice won the International Emmy Award for Best Drama Series and has inspired international remakes.

An American adaptation of the series was produced by ABC and ran for one season from October 2008 to April 2009. A Spanish adaptation of the series was broadcast from April to June 2009. A Russian adaptation of the series entitled The Dark Side of the Moon was broadcast in November 2012. A Czech adaptation World under the Head was broadcast by Czech Television from January to March 2017. The South Korean adaptation began broadcasting in June 2018. In February 2019, the BBC announced the production of a Chinese version, to be set in the 1990s. A sequel to the series, Ashes to Ashes, whose title references another David Bowie song, aired on BBC One from February 2008 to May 2010. A third and final series was reported as in development in 2020, although it has yet to enter production.

Plot 
Life on Mars tells the fictional story of Sam Tyler (John Simm), a policeman in service with the Greater Manchester Police (GMP). After being hit by a car in 2006, Tyler awakens in 1973 to find himself working for a predecessor of the GMP, the Manchester and Salford Police, at the same station and location as in 2006.  Early on in the series, it becomes apparent to Tyler that he awakes as a Detective Inspector, one rank lower than his 2006 rank of Detective Chief Inspector. As part of the Criminal Investigation Department, Tyler finds himself working under the command of DCI Gene Hunt (Philip Glenister). Throughout the two series, the plot is based on the ambiguity of Tyler's predicament and the lack of clarity, to both the audience and the character, whether he has died, become comatose or travelled in time.

Production and transmission 
The programme was conceived in 1998, when screenwriters Matthew Graham and Ashley Pharoah were sent on a break to the English seaside resort of Blackpool by Kudos Film & Television to think up programme ideas. Originally titled Ford Granada after the 1970s car, the series was rejected by the BBC. In response, Graham stated: "Back then, broadcasters just weren't comfortable with something like that, something that wasn't set in the real world and that had a fantasy element to it." According to Graham, the initial idea was for a humorous, pre-watershed programme that overtly mocked the styles and attitudes of the 1970s, with the comic actor Neil Morrissey envisaged as the central character.

Later, Channel 4 drama executive John Yorke substantially redeveloped the original script, focusing on a double act between Sam Tyler and Gene Hunt. Senior management eventually decided not to pursue the idea, with Graham stating that the reaction to the idea was: "It's going to be silly", as told to Radio Times. The series eventually attracted the attention of BBC Wales' Julie Gardner, who persuaded the Head of Drama for the BBC, Jane Tranter, to commission the programme from BBC Wales for BBC One. John Yorke left Channel 4 to rejoin the BBC and together with Julie Gardner, he acted as joint commissioning editor on the show for its entire run.

The programme's central character was originally to have been named "Sam Williams" but Kudos felt this not to be striking enough and requested Graham devise an alternative surname. Graham asked his young daughter for her opinion and she suggested "Sam Tyler", which became the character's name. Graham subsequently discovered that his daughter had named him after the Doctor Who character Rose Tyler. The initial geographical setting was to be London; this was then changed to Leeds and finally to Manchester, as part of a BBC initiative to make more programmes in the city. The name Sam Williams was subsequently used as a plot point in the second series.

Eight one-hour episodes of Life on Mars were broadcast weekly on Monday nights at 9:00 pm by the BBC. For the second series, Graham,  and Chibnall returned to write episodes, joined by Julie Rutterford, Guy Jenkin and Mark Greig.

The second series was broadcast weekly at the same time as the first but on Tuesdays. According to Jane Featherstone, the show's executive producer, speaking in February 2006, a film version of the show was also a possibility: "Life on Mars was a very high concept idea and there was no doubt it would work on the big screen".

On 9 October 2006, it was confirmed that the second series of Life on Mars would be the last. Matthew Graham stated: "We decided that Sam's journey should have a finite life span and a clear-cut ending and we feel that we have now reached that point after two series". Graham's claim that two endings had been filmed was later revealed to be a ruse.

The second series had a distinctive style of introduction on BBC One: after a brief collage of momentary images, such as several test cards and comedy writer and broadcaster Barry Took, a mock-up version of BBC1's 1970s blue-on-black rotating globe ident was used, although the design had to be modified to fit widescreen sets. This was accompanied by a bass-voiced continuity announcer in the style of that era. Viewers in Wales saw an original 'BBC Cymru Wales' mechanical globe with introductions provided by former BBC Wales announcers. Trailers for the show also used the 1970s style, including the rhombus-style BBC logo.

Third series 
In April 2020, creator Matthew Graham tweeted that a third series was in production. Set in Manchester and London, the series is initially planned to consist of four or five episodes. Ashley Pharoah confirmed the show will be called Lazarus, once again after the name of a David Bowie song. Simm confirmed in January 2022 that he was involved, reprising his role as Sam Tyler along with Philip Glenister as Gene Hunt.

Overseas sales 
David E. Kelley produced the pilot for an American version of the series for the ABC network, though he handed duties over to others for the series production. It premiered in October 2008, and was broadcast to minor critical and public acclaim where declining numbers led to cancellation in April 2009 after 17 episodes, though with sufficient lead to allow the storyline to be concluded.

The first series of the original Life on Mars was broadcast in the United States on BBC America from July 2006 to August 2007 and was broadcast in 2010 on some public television stations, with the second series being broadcast from December 2007 to January 2008. Acorn Media released both series on DVD in 2008.

The original version also was broadcast in Canada from September 2006 to April 2007 on BBC Canada, and from 8 January 2008 to 23 April 2008 on Télé-Québec in French and Showcase in English.

In New Zealand the original series was broadcast on TV One from February 2007, being described as "sensationally well-made" by a NZ website. Series two was broadcast from June 2008, with the final screening on 4 August 2008.

In Australia the original British version was broadcast on ABC1 from 20 May 2007, with the second following during February 2008. The US version broadcast on 5 February 2009 on Network Ten.

In the Republic of Ireland RTÉ Two broadcast the series from June 2007 in a late evening slot, following RTÉ News on Two.

The show has also been transmitted in Croatia (Croatian Radiotelevision), Sweden (a cut version on SVT 2), Netherlands (Nederland 3), in Germany (Kabel 1), Greece (Skai TV), Spain (Antena.neox), Israel (Hot), Italy (Rai Due), Japan, Serbia (B92), Norway (NRK) and Estonia (ERR). Sub began broadcasting Life on Mars in Finland in April 2008, and ATV World started broadcasting the show in Hong Kong on 13 July 2008, France (13ème Rue). In Hungary (Duna TV) Life on Mars started in March 2011.
Spanish Television network Antena 3 bought the rights from the BBC and has remade the show as La Chica de Ayer (English: The Girl from Yesterday, the title taken from a 1980 pop song), set in 1977 post-Franco Spain.

The series began on 5 November 2012, running for 16 episodes. It tells the story of Moscow police captain Mikhail Mikhailovich Solovyov (Михаил Михайлович Соловьёв), who is hit by a car in 2012 during pursuit of a suspect, and wakes up in hospital in Soviet Moscow in 1979. Soon Mikhail is released, and takes the place of his father, Mikhail Ivanovich Solovyov.

Czech national TV channel ČT1 has made a TV series heavily inspired by Life on Mars, called  (World under the head). It tells the story of an elite policeman Filip Marvan, who is hit by a car and wakes up in a hospital in 1982, in Communist Czechoslovakia. The name of the series refers to a line from a song V stínu kapradiny by Jana Kratochvílová. The first episode of the series aired on 2 January 2017, scheduled to run for 10 episodes in total.

A South Korean adaptation developed by Studio Dragon and produced by Production H for pay TV network OCN aired from 9 June to 5 August 2018.

Music 

The programme's soundtrack features mainly early 1970s songs which were played as part of Life on Mars, as well as an original score of the theme music as part of the title sequence composed by Edmund Butt. The show's title is in reference to the David Bowie song, "Life on Mars?", which plays on an iPod in Sam's car while he is run over, and on an 8-track tape in a Rover P6 when he awakes in 1973; it is used again at the climax of the final episode, and fleeting moments of the song are periodically used throughout the third series of the programme's sequel, Ashes to Ashes, to allude to Sam Tyler's fate.

Matthew Graham stated that initially there were some concerns over whether the production team would be able to license the song, which, had they been denied, would have necessitated retitling the series. Another Bowie song, "Space Oddity", is used in BBC trailers advertising the series. In several episodes, Gene Hunt adopts the name "Gene Genie", in reference to yet another Bowie song, "The Jean Genie", used in the fourth episode. Another Bowie track, "Changes", is played over the end credits of the second series finale.

The show's creators were initially refused permission to use "Live and Let Die" by Paul McCartney and Wings but, according to Graham in the Radio Times, "We sent the episode directly to Paul McCartney. Almost immediately, his assistant phoned back and said, 'Paul loves it. You can go ahead and use it'".

Music used

Soundtrack CD track listing

Characters 

The methodology and techniques of modern policing that Sam Tyler employs during Life on Mars lead him into clashes with other characters. Gene Hunt and the rest of the CID appear to favour brutality and corruption to secure convictions, as shown by their willingness to physically coerce confessions and fabricate evidence. In both series, Tyler clashes with Hunt the most frequently, usually because Tyler values forensic evidence whereas Hunt often resorts to traditional methods and gut instincts. In one episode during Series 1, in which doubt is cast on several suspects, Hunt insists that "the first to speak is guilty" and frequently refers to the 'Gene Genie'.

Sam describes Hunt as an "overweight, over-the-hill, nicotine-stained, borderline alcoholic homophobe with a superiority complex and an unhealthy obsession with male bonding", to which Hunt responds, "You make that sound like a bad thing". Hunt is supported by his fiercely loyal subordinates, Chris Skelton and Ray Carling, with the latter portrayed as a character similar to Hunt. Ray and Sam often disagree with each other and Sam and Gene have a love-hate relationship. Chris, in contrast, becomes friendly with Sam and respects his modern methods, finding his loyalty torn between Gene and Sam.

Given Sam's predicament, he avoids revealing his suspicion that he may have travelled back in time, for fear that others will think he is insane. The only person in 1973 to whom Sam fully reveals his story is Annie Cartwright. According to Liz White, the actress who played Cartwright, "She gets very tired of his constant talk about how this situation is not real, that they are all figments of his imagination — she can only explain it as psychological trauma from his car crash".

Themes and storyline 

After the premiere, each of the remaining fifteen episodes begins with a short teaser before a monologue in which Sam repeats, as part of the moving imagery of the title sequence:

My name is Sam Tyler. I had an accident and I woke up in 1973. Am I mad, in a coma, or back in time? Whatever's happened, it's like I've landed on a different planet. Now, maybe if I can work out the reason, I can get home.

This questioning is a central plot device throughout the series, displaying both the character's and the audience's uncertainty about what has happened.

Throughout the course of Life on Mars, Sam's uncertainty is reinforced by frequent paranormal phenomena, such as hearing voices and seeing images from 2006 on radios, telephones, and televisions. The voices discuss his medical condition, leading him to partially believe that he is in a coma. Other elements suggest to him that he is insane, such as his frequent and unexpected encounters with the Test Card Girl from Test Card F, who speaks directly to him. Annie Cartwright partially persuades Sam that he is truly in 1973, arguing that his mind would be unable to fabricate the amount of detail and tangibility in the world where he finds himself, evidence that he is in fact in 1973.

Sam's uncertain situation is not the focal point of most episodes, remaining a sub-plot. In most episodes, the main plot centres on a particular crime or case relating to the police, such as drug trafficking, a hostage situation, murders and robberies. For this reason, most episodes follow a conventional police drama format. As the series progresses, Sam focuses on how he will get home in almost every episode.

A recurring motif throughout the series is the overlapping of the past and present. For example, during Series 1: Episode 6 Sam hears the voice of his mother in 2006, telling him his life-support will be switched off at 2:00 pm. At the same time he is called into a hostage-taking situation, where the perpetrator states that he will kill his victims at precisely the same hour. Sam also encounters as their younger selves people whom he knows in the future, including suspects, friends, his own parents, and himself as a child.

Sam comes from an era in which suspects' rights and the preservation of forensic evidence are stringently observed. His background leads Sam into conflict, as other characters exhibit openly sexist, homophobic, and racist behaviour, and often indulge all these prejudices while carrying out their police duties.

The series frequently makes use of Gene Hunt's comical rudeness in the form of jokes and dramatic irony about a future which the audience already knows, but which the characters in 1973 do not. For example, in Series 1: Episode 5, Hunt declares, "There will never be a woman prime minister as long as I have a hole in my arse." However, in line with the ambivalence of the Hunt character, the irony is qualified by the fact that, in the real 1973, Margaret Thatcher herself told the BBC's Valerie Singleton in an interview, "I don't think there will be a woman Prime Minister in my lifetime." The clip of this remark had often been replayed on British TV and the audience would be familiar with it.

Another theme in the show is Sam's confusion about police work in 1973, as he often mistakenly mentions techniques and technologies that were not used in 1973, such as two-way mirrors. One such theme is that Sam continually gives criminals the updated version of the right to silence warning, which was changed in 1994. When he does so, someone around him usually points out that he is giving the warning incorrectly.

Finale 

It is revealed in the final episode that Sam's coma had lasted so long because he had a tumour of the brain. Tyler comes to believe the tumour is embodied by Hunt, and begins to think that by bringing Hunt down, his own body can recover. To this end, Tyler begins to collaborate with Frank Morgan (Ralph Brown) to bring Hunt down. While Tyler and the team are engaged in a firefight with armed robbers, Sam returns to 2006. He eventually comes to realise that he has become used to, and enjoys, the 1970s, seeing it as his "real world". In an attempt to get back to 1973 to save Annie and the rest of the team from death, Sam leaps off the roof of the police station, arriving back in 1973 and saving the team, promising never to leave them again. Writer Matthew Graham wrote the scene to indicate that Sam is now in the afterlife, but acknowledged that the ending is ambiguous and open to other interpretations, such as lead actor John Simm's belief that Sam may not have returned to the present. One way this could work is that Sam is actually the Hyde detective that Frank Morgan says he is, who had an accident on the way to Manchester.  The doctor treating Sam in the future is the same as Frank Morgan, but Sam couldn't have seen him in the future since he's in a coma.  The only way they could be the same is if the Frank Morgan in 1973 is the real one, and Sam is hallucinating the future doctor.

In the final scene, the team drive off, with Sam and Gene bickering as usual. Children run past, including the girl from Test Card F who symbolizes the death that has been stalking Sam since the beginning. She looks directly into the camera before reaching out and "switching off" the television the viewer is watching, signifying that Sam's life has come to an end.

The first episode of sequel series Ashes to Ashes shows that the protagonist, DI Alex Drake of the Metropolitan Police, has been studying Tyler's notes and 2006-era personnel file, in which his photograph is overstamped with the word "SUICIDE" - consistent with what happened in the series finale. Ashes to Ashes implies that Gene Hunt's world is in some sense real, and states that Sam lived on in that world, during which time he married Annie but had no children.

In the final episode of "Ashes to Ashes" a fuller explanation for Sam Tyler's experience is provided, when the role of Gene Hunt in both Life on Mars and Ashes to Ashes is revealed.

Depiction of 1973 
During an interview John Stalker, Deputy Chief Constable of Greater Manchester in the early 1980s and himself a Detective Inspector in 1973, has stated that the depiction of the police "has got nothing to do with real policing in the 1970s. It could not be more inaccurate in terms of procedure, the way they talk or the way they dress. In all the time I was in the CID in the 1970s I never saw a copper in a leather bomber jacket and I never heard an officer call anyone 'guv'. ... Actually, there were a few police officers in London who started to behave like Regan and Carter in The Sweeney, but that was a case of life following art, not the other way round". The journalist who interviewed Stalker, Ray King, remarks that the depiction of the police can be defended if we assume that Sam is indeed in a coma and that we are seeing his imaginary idea of 1973, filtered through 1970s police shows.

Upon Sam Tyler awaking in 1973, he finds himself on a building site, beneath a large advertising board, proclaiming the construction of a new motorway, the Mancunian Way. In reality, construction of Mancunian Way was completed in 1967. According to Matthew Graham, writing in the Radio Times, the error was deliberate. "We knew that this road was built in the 1960s, but we took a bit of artistic licence". Minor historical anachronisms such as this are present throughout Life on Mars. Some, as above, were made out of artistic licence whilst others were deliberately inserted to confuse the issue of whether Sam Tyler was in a coma, mad or really back in time. Many inaccuracies were visible such as modern street furniture, cable television cabinets, satellite television dishes, CCTV cameras, LCD digital watches and double-glazed uPVC window frames, which were all unintentional. During DVD commentaries for the series, the programme makers acknowledge these as errors but also point out they are perfectly feasible, given Sam's situation. As the popularity of the series grew, the hunting of such anachronisms became a favourite pastime among Life on Mars fans.

Greater Manchester was formed in 1974, consequently the show references the police officers working for Lancashire Constabulary, rather than Greater Manchester Police.  However, in 1973 Hyde would have been covered by the Cheshire Police area.  Therefore, an undercover officer from Hyde working in Manchester would suggest Lancashire Constabulary was being investigated by a different police force.

The brown Ford Cortina used by Gene throughout both of the seasons was a 1974 model, which makes it anachronistic. In production, three different cars were used.

Cultural references 
Hyde, a town to the east of Manchester, is used as Sam's former police division as a clue that his 1973 self is an alter ego, as in Robert Louis Stevenson's The Strange Case of Dr Jekyll and Mr Hyde.

Reception

Critical reception 
Critical reaction to the first series of Life on Mars was extremely positive. Steve O'Brien, writing for SFX, declared, "It looks like BBC One has ... a monster hit on its hands ... It's funny ... and dramatic and exciting, and we're really not getting paid for saying this". Alison Graham, television editor for the Radio Times, described the series as "a genuinely innovative and imaginative take on an old genre". James Walton of The Daily Telegraph commented, "Theoretically, this should add up to a right old mess. In practice, it makes for a thumpingly enjoyable piece of television — not least because everybody involved was obviously having such a great time". Sam Wollaston of The Guardian wrote: "Life on Mars was more than just a jolly, tongue-in-cheek romp into the past ... Once there, in 1973, we find ourselves immersed in a reasonably gripping police drama — yes, The Sweeney, perhaps, with better production values ... Or put another — undeniably laboured — way, as poor Sam Tyler walks through his sunken dream, I'm hooked to the silver screen". Critical reaction remained generally positive throughout the programme's run. Of the second series, Alison Graham believed that "Sam Tyler and Gene Hunt are shaping up nicely as one of the great TV detective partnerships ... It's vastly enjoyable and manages to stay just about believable thanks to some strong writing and, of course, the two marvellous central performances".

Nancy Banks-Smith, in The Guardian, felt that the time-paradox aspect of the programme had become somewhat confusing. Banks-Smith summed up the programme's success as "an inspired take on the usual formula of Gruff Copper of the old school, who solves cases by examining the entrails of a chicken, and Sensitive Sidekick, who has a degree in detection.".

Two days after the final episode's transmission, Life on Mars was attacked in the British press by the National Association of Schoolmasters/Union of Women Teachers (better known as NASUWT), who claimed that Gene Hunt's use of homophobic insults in the programme could encourage copycat bullying in schools. The BBC stated that Life on Mars was targeted at an adult audience, and argued that Hunt's characterisation was "extreme and tongue-in-cheek".

In 2019, The Guardian ranked it 99th in the top 100 TV shows of the 21st century.

Ratings 
Life on Mars was a ratings success. The first series achieved an average audience figure of 6.8 million viewers and regularly won its timeslot, despite competition from ITV1's popular comedy-drama series Northern Lights. The first series' finale gained 7.1 million viewers and a 28% audience share.

Viewing figures for the second series were initially low, with the first episode only attracting 5.7 million viewers, slumping to 4.8 million viewers by episode three, despite being heavily trailed and publicised. These figures were blamed by The Stage on "poor scheduling and unfortunate sporting fixtures, possibly combined with high expectation". Audience figures picked up during the second series' run, however, with the final episode gaining an average of seven million viewers (a 28% audience share), despite competition from UEFA Champions League football on ITV1.

Accolades 
The series twice won the International Emmy Award for Best Drama Series in 2006 and 2008. In January 2007, it won the Best New Programme category as part of the Broadcast Magazine awards. In March 2007 it won two categories, Best Drama Series and the Writers' Award, at the Broadcasting Press Guild Awards.

The first series was nominated for a British Academy Television Award (BAFTA) in the Best Drama Series category. John Simm was also nominated as Best Actor for his work on the show. The programme won the audience-voted "Pioneer Award".

In October 2007, series two was nominated as the Most Popular Drama at the 2007 National Television Awards.

Home media

DVD

Blu-ray 

 Note: Due to the popularity of the show, Blu-ray editions of both series were released on 27 October 2008. However, since the show's various effects were originally edited and mastered in standard definition, a true HD version would require a near-total overhaul. The Blu-ray editions therefore contained studio-upscaled footage of the original SD content, providing some improvement. This pseudo-HD version is not known to have been broadcast on television.

Books

Companion books 
There have been 2 official tie-in books to accompany the series featuring episode summaries, cast and character profiles, music listings to each show, script extracts, plus behind-the-scenes content and never before seen photos.

Humour 
 The Rules of Modern Policing (1973 Edition) by "DCI Gene Hunt" (Bantam Press) [8 October 2007]
A parody of a police manual that made fun of the conventions of 1970s British police procedurals like The Sweeney. It also contained a glossary of British 1970s slang terms. The actual author of the text is Guy Adams.
 The Wit and Wisdom of Gene Hunt by "DC Chris Skelton and DS Ray Carling" (again, Guy Adams) (Bantam Press)
A book detailing the philosophy of Gene Hunt as told by his disciples.

Novels 

On 12 March 2012, Kate Bradley, Commissioning Editor at HarperCollins, secured a deal with Kudos Film and Television to publish four brand new Life on Mars novels. The Life on Mars books were published exclusively as eBooks at roughly three-month intervals, but were successful enough to generate the release of hard copy, trade paperbacks in August 2013. The author of the series is Tom Graham, Matthew Graham's brother. (Despite earlier speculation that the brother identity was a pseudonym for another writer—based on a preponderance of misleading evidence that turned out to consist of improbably high coincidence—the by-line, and the familial relationship, are absolutely authentic.)

Content-wise, the novels begin to explore the continuity gap between Life on Mars and Ashes to Ashes, picking up approximately where the first TV series leaves off; but it is not necessary to know both series to enjoy the books. Said Tom Graham in a pre-publication interview: "…I made a very conscious decision to move on from the show, not to tinker or play around with pre-existing story lines. There is more than enough new and unused material for my books without me going back and plundering previous episodes. Also (and this is one of the realities of publishing) my books had to in some way stand apart from the show and be accessible to readers who only vaguely remember Life on Mars but haven’t seen it since it was first aired. There were times I felt like Peter Jackson making The Lord of the Rings Trilogy – like him, I have to appeal to the hard core fan, the semi-fan, the part-time fan, and the casual passing punter who’s never even heard of the thing. Unlike Jackson, I didn’t have a half a billion dollars budget riding on it, but the principle's the same. So, I have very deliberately written books that recall the TV show, jog memories of characters and events from the show, recreate the atmosphere and ethos of the show, but don’t require an in-depth knowledge of minor characters and plot points. We don’t (yet) plunge into the finer details of the LoM mythology that would mystify the general reader, but if further books are commissioned, there will be plenty of room to get stuck into the minutiae!"

Though each book can stand on its own, the four are best read as a tetralogy, in order of listing below, as there is a superstructure linking them together. They are:
 
 
 
 
(Each of the book titles is a play on a pop culture phrase or film title that is of, or relevant to, the '70s, those being Blood, Bullets and Babes, A Fistful of Dollars, Borstal Boy and Get Carter).

Pop culture
Not Going Out - Life on Mars Bars, Lee has a similar experience to Sam Tyler. Lee is hit by a car whilst the song Life on Mars plays and finds out he is in a coma.
The Catherine Tate Show - Life at Ma's sketches with Tom Ellis as Sam Speed, a modern-day policemen who, after an accident, finds himself back in time and struggling to cope with outdated attitudes.

References

External links

 
 
 Episode reviews of the series at The Anorak Zone

2000s British crime drama television series
2000s British mystery television series
2000s British police procedural television series
2000s British science fiction television series
2006 British television series debuts
2007 British television series endings
BBC Cymru Wales television shows
BBC television dramas
British supernatural television shows
British time travel television series
English-language television shows
International Emmy Award for Best Drama Series winners
Life on Mars (franchise)
Television series set in 1973
Television series set in 2006
Television shows set in Manchester
Television series by Endemol